The Russian Novel is a 2012 South Korean film written and directed by Shin Yeon-shick about an aspiring author who wakes up from a 27-year coma as one of his country's finest authors, credited for a book he didn't write.

It made its world premiere in 2012 at the 17th Busan International Film Festival where Shin won Best Director from the Director's Guild of Korea.

Plot
Shin-hyo is a frustrated writer who dreams of becoming a great author, but being uneducated and lacking in skill, he finds it difficult to succeed. His inspiration comes from the writer, Kim Ki-jin, who he soon learns is the father of one of his friends, Sung-hwan. Shin-hyo manages to convince Sung-hwan and a talented young writer named Kyung-mi to help him arrange a meeting with Kim Ki-jin to show him his work. He falls into a depression when Kim calls his work "trash" which leads to him throwing his manuscripts into the river. They are rescued by the preacher's daughter, Jae-hye. Jae-hye, who is in love with Shin-hyo, re-types the novels as a form of encouragement. Because of a drug overdose, he ends up in a coma. Twenty-seven years later, Shin-hyo wakes from a vegetative state and learns that he has become a literary sensation and is now a well-respected author in South Korea. The book, The Russian Novel, allowed him to achieve his status in the literary world, however, he realizes that it is not his work. Someone has taken his manuscripts, which have been revised, and delivered them to Sung-hwan who got them published. He tries to find out who the culprit is and who wrote the book, especially the famous last words of the story which he didn't write.

Cast
 Kang Shin-hyo as Shin-hyo
 Kyung Sung-hwan as Sung-hwan 
 Lee Jae-hye as Jae-hye
 Lee Kyung-mi as Kyung-mi
 Kim Jung-suk as Jung-suk
 Lee Bit-na as Ga-rim
 Choi Jong-ryul as Father's younger brother
 Park Min-jung as Ji-ae
 Lee Yoo-mi as Yoo-mi
 Gil Chang-gyu as middle-aged Seong-gyu
 Yang Seong-gyu as young Seong-gyu
 Lee Hyeon-ho as Soo-young 
 Park Sang-ah as Radio announcer 
 Kim Sang-mi as young Ji-hyun
 Noh Soo-kyung as Soo-kyung 
 Seo Jung-sik as Jung-sik 
 Choi Myeong-hyo as Kim Ki-jin 
 Jeong Hoon-hee as middle-aged Ji-hyun

Reception
Elizabeth Kerr of The Hollywood Reporter wrote, "There's an interesting film about art and fame buried deep beneath an unwieldy one about an irritating writer." Koreanfilm.org called it "a near-miss" that "could have been a much more powerful cinematic experience." Pierce Conran of Modern Korean Cinema praised it as "one of the 2012's most unique and lush Korean films."

Awards and nominations

References

External links
 
 
 

2012 films
Films directed by Shin Yeon-shick
South Korean drama films
2010s South Korean films